All Saints' Hospital was a mental health facility in Winson Green, Birmingham, England.

History
The facility was designed by DR Hill and opened as the Birmingham City Asylum in June 1850. Annexes were built at the Leveretts in Handsworth in 1900 and at Glenthorne in Erdington in 1902. The facility became Birmingham City Asylum in the early 20th century. It joined the National Health Service as Birmingham Mental Hospital in 1949. Following the introduction of Care in the Community in the early 1980s, the hospital went into a period of decline and eventually closed in April 2000. Although the accommodation blocks have been demolished, the main building now forms offices for HM Prison Birmingham.

References

Defunct hospitals in England
Hospitals in Birmingham, West Midlands